The 1920 Tennessee gubernatorial election was held on November 2, 1920. Republican nominee Alfred A. Taylor defeated Democratic incumbent Albert H. Roberts with 54.93% of the vote. 

Albert alienated a significant portion of his party by enacting unpopular tax reforms and helping ratify the 19th Amendment (which gave women the right to vote). Taylor also supported the 19th Amendment, but he campaigned primarily against Roberts' tax reforms. This was the state's first gubernatorial election in which women could vote.

After Taylor, no Republican would win an election for governor until Winfield Dunn won in 1970.

Primary elections
Primary elections were held on August 5, 1920.

Democratic primary

Candidates
Albert H. Roberts, incumbent Governor
W. H. Crabtree
John Randolph Neal Jr., attorney
W. L. Wirt

Results

General election

Candidates
Major party candidates
Alfred A. Taylor, Republican 
Albert H. Roberts, Democratic

Other candidates
J. M. Lindsley, Socialist

Results

References

1920
Tennessee
Gubernatorial